BCY may refer to:

Brockley railway station, London, National Rail station code
CityJet, an Irish regional airline headquartered in Swords, Dublin (ICAO airport code)